KTAS is a television station in California. 

KTAS may also refer to:
 Kjøbenhavns Telefon Aktieselskab, a former Danish telephone company (now part of TDC)
 Knots true airspeed, the speed of the aircraft relative to the airmass in which it is flying